Hope Cove Life Boat (based in Hope Cove, Devon) was formed in 1878 and is a voluntary search and rescue service that operates  an inshore rescue boat in the Bigbury Bay area.

History
In 1878 The Royal National Lifeboat Institution established a lifeboat station at Hope Cove provided by The Freemasons of England. The land for the boat house was donated by the Earl of Devon. Replacement boats were supplied in 1887, 1900 and 1903 and all four lifeboats were named Alexandra. The station was closed in April 1930 by which time the neighbouring station at  had been equipped  with a motor lifeboat which could cover Bigbury Bay.

From 1992 a rescue boat was based in Inner Hope and manned by volunteers under the management of the Maritime and Coastguard Agency (MCA) as part of the Cliff Rescue Team (CRT). The decision was made in 2010 that the MCA would no longer maintain any rescue boats in the UK.

Current operation
The Under Secretary for Transport recognised the ongoing need for this sea rescue facility in Bigbury Bay and gave the village the opportunity to run an independent lifeboat. A public meeting was held in the village and unanimous support given to form a limited company and registered charity to achieve this. The Hope Cove Life Boat became the 63rd Independent lifeboat service in the UK and has since worked with the MCA and the RNLI to continue to meet their goal of protecting and preserving life in Bigbury Bay.

It is a company limited by guarantee, number 07456004, and registered charity number 1140126.

The 6.4m Rigid-hulled inflatable boat (RIB) "Alexandra" built by Ribcraft of Yeovil was blessed by the Bishop of Plymouth on 31 March 2013 and entered service 1 April 2013.

Neighbouring Station Locations

See also
 Independent lifeboats in Britain and Ireland

References

Lifeboat stations in Devon
Organisations based in Devon
Independent Lifeboat stations
South Huish